Jettie Fokkens (born ) is a retired Dutch volleyball and beach volleyball player.

She was part of the Netherlands women's national volleyball team at the 1998 FIVB Volleyball Women's World Championship in Japan. In 2003, she played beach volleyball together with Mered de Vries.

References

1975 births
Living people
Dutch women's volleyball players
Dutch women's beach volleyball players
People from Veendam
Sportspeople from Groningen (province)